Bricks is the debut studio album by New Zealand singer-songwriter Benny Tipene. It was released on 17 October 2014. It was produced by Sam de Jong at Parachute Studios. The album was re-released in June 2015, containing three new songs and acoustic versions of 'Step On Up' and 'Give This Up'.

Track listing

Charts

Credits
Guitars, Bass & Vocal - Benny Tipene
Drums and Programming - Sam de Jong
Production and Engineering - Sam de Jong
A&R - Jaden Parkes
A&R Administration - Lizzie McGowan
Design - Harrison Burt & Jaden Parkes
Photography - C. Alex de Freitas
'No Good For Me' Original Arrangement - Josh Fountain
Recorded at Parachute Studios
Mixed by Nic Manders at Wairaki Rd
Mastered by Leon Zervos at Studio 301

References

2014 debut albums
Benny Tipene albums
Sony Music New Zealand albums
Albums produced by Sam de Jong